Félix Máriássy (1919–1975) was a Hungarian film editor and director.

Selected filmography

Director 
 Mrs. Szabó (1949)
 Rokonok (1954)
 A Glass of Beer (1955)
 The Smugglers (1958)
 Bábolna, 1964 (1964)
 Imposztorok (1969)

Editor 
 Afrikai völegény (1944)
 Treasured Earth (1948)
 Valahol Európában (1948)

Bibliography
 Burns, Bryan. World Cinema: Hungary. Fairleigh Dickinson University Press, 1996.
 Cunningham, John. Hungarian Cinema: From Coffee House to Multiplex. Wallflower Press, 2004.

External links
 

1919 births
1975 deaths
Hungarian film directors
Hungarian film editors
People from Markusovce